"My Son" is a song written and recorded by American country music singer Jan Howard. It is among several songs recorded by country artists during this period that related to the Vietnam War. The song is based on a letter Howard wrote to her son, Jimmy, who was drafted into the war. After writing the letter, she was inspired by family and friends to put it to music. Recording the song in a single take, it was released as a single in 1968.

Howard sent the song to her son in 1968 after its release. Before he could write back, he was killed in battle. At the same time, "My Son" became a major hit on the country charts in the United States. The recording later appeared on Howard's 1969 self-titled studio album. Since its release, "My Son" has been considered among Howard's signature songs. In later years, the song also has also been featured in documentaries that discuss the Vietnam War.

Background
In 1968, Howard's oldest son, Jimmy, was drafted and soon serving in the Vietnam War. In her autobiography Howard said that she frequently wrote letters to her son to keep him updated on things happening at home. At some points, she was writing to him as much as two to three times per week. In one particular letter Howard described a feeling of "no control" over what she was composing. 

She remembered feeling that the letter was important and she shared it with other son, Carter. "Mom, you need to put that to music," he said to Howard. After spending more time thinking about it, she showed it to Bill Anderson, Howard's duet partner while recording for Decca Records. Anderson encouraged Howard to record it. Anderson and several session musicians helped create a musical background for the letter. With their assistance, a demo of the song was recorded in a studio. With Anderson's encouragement, Howard presented the demo to her producer, Owen Bradley.

Recording
After hearing the track, Bradley replied, "Jan, you've got to record this...it's your masterpiece." Bradley arranged for its official recording session to take place. However, upon going into the studio, Howard had trouble singing it. "I tried to put it down on tape, but I couldn't get through it without crying," she said in 2003. Bradley noticed that Howard was becoming emotional while recording and offered a proposition. "Tell you what, if you can get through it once, we'll take it, okay?" Howard agreed and she was able to sing the song one time in the studio. The official recording session took place on October 4, 1968 at Bradley's Barn, a studio owned by Bradley himself. It was located in Nashville, Tennessee. Three additional tracks were cut in the same session, which later appeared on Howard's 1969 studio album. After she left the recording studio, Howard acquired a seven-inch tape with the song on it. She then sent the tape her son Jimmy in Vietnam.

Release and reception
In November 1968, the song (now titled "My Son") was released as a single by Decca Records. It was issued on a 7" vinyl record format featuring Howard's cover of Bill Anderson's, "The Tip of My Fingers", on the B-side. In early 1969, the song became a major hit on the country charts in the United States. In the United States, "My Son" peaked at number 15 on the Billboard Hot Country Singles chart, becoming her fourth major hit on the Decca label. In Canada, "My Son" peaked at number 28 on the RPM Country Singles chart. It was Howard's final single as a solo artist to chart in Canada. The song was featured on Howard's seventh studio record, which was released in 1969. The album itself reached a peak of 25 on the Billboard Top Country Albums chart.

Two weeks after the song's release to radio, Jimmy was killed in battle. After "My Son" became a hit, she received over 5,000 letters from veterans and their families. Since his death and the song's release, Howard has only been able to perform it on rare occasions. "And I still get so many requests for it, but I can't do that. I do it once in a great while only for a special thing like Veterans' Day", Howard said in 2015. Howard also has said that she is pleased with how "My Son" has been an inspiration for other military members and their families.

Legacy
Since its release, "My Son" has received acclaim and attention from music journalists and historians. In their 2003 book, Finding Their Voice: The History of Women in Country Music, Mary A. Bufwack and Robert K. Oermann called the song "a moving recitation". Kevin John Coyne of Country Universe called it "her most personal song" in 2018. Lee Andresen recounted the story of "My Son" in his book Battle Notes: Music of the Vietnam War. Ken Burns also brought attention to the song in two of his documentaries; 2017's The Vietnam War and 2019's Country Music. In the latter, Burns described the song as "a mother's prayer for the safe return of her child." Burns interviewed Howard for his Vietnam War documentary, during which she told a story about antiwar protestors asking her to join them in response to Jimmy's death. Howard replied, "...go ahead and demonstrate. Have at it. . . . But I tell you what, if you ever ring my doorbell again, I'll blow your damned head off with a .357 Magnum."

Track listings 
7" vinyl single
 "My Son" – 2:46
 "The Tip of My Fingers" – 2:53

Charts

Weekly charts

References

Footnotes

Books

External links
 "My Son" lyrics at Lyrics.com

1968 singles
1968 songs
Decca Records singles
Jan Howard songs
Songs written by Jan Howard
Song recordings produced by Owen Bradley
Songs of the Vietnam War
Songs about mothers
Songs about soldiers